
Lago del Zött is a reservoir in the canton of Ticino, Switzerland, with a surface area of 0.13 km². Its 36 m arch dam was completed in 1967 and holds a volume of 1.65 mio m³.

See also
List of mountain lakes of Switzerland

External links
Swissdams: Zöt

Zott
Zott
Zott